Tarasovo , rural localities in Russia, may refer to:

 Tarasovo, Kursk Oblast, a selo
 Tarasovo, Kochyovsky District, Perm Krai, a village
 Tarasovo, Gryazovetsky District, Vologda Oblast, a village
 Tarasovo, Kichmengsko-Gorodetsky District, Vologda Oblast, a village
 Tarasovo, Nikolsky District, Vologda Oblast, a village
 Tarasovo, Plesetsky District, Arkhangelsk Oblast, a village
 Tarasovo, Vologodsky District, Vologda Oblast, a village
 Tarasovo, Volgograd Oblast, a selo

See also
 Tarasov